Justice Mason may refer to:

Anthony Mason (judge), chief justice of the High Court of Australia
Charles Mason (Iowa judge), chief justice of the Iowa Supreme Court
Charles Mason (New York judge), judge of the New York Court of Appeals
Charles W. Mason, associate justice of the Oklahoma Supreme Court
Henry F. Mason, associate justice of the Kansas Supreme Court
John Thomson Mason Jr., judge of the Maryland Court of Appeals
John W. Mason, associate justice of the Supreme Court of Appeals of West Virginia
M.L. Mason, associate justice of the Iowa Supreme Court
Oliver P. Mason, associate justice of the Nebraska Supreme Court
Thomson Mason, chief justice of the Supreme Court of Virginia